Acontias gariepensis, the Mier Kalahari legless skink,  is a species of lizard in the family Scincidae. It is found in Namibia, Botswana, and South Africa.

References

Acontias
Skinks of Africa
Reptiles of Botswana
Reptiles of Namibia
Reptiles of South Africa
Reptiles described in 1941
Taxa named by Vivian Frederick Maynard FitzSimons